Mona the Vampire is a Canadian children's animated television series that aired on YTV. The series broadcast 65 episodes over 4 seasons, from September 13, 1999 to February 22, 2006.

Series overview

Episodes

Season 1 (1999–2001)

Season 2 (2001)

Season 3 (2002)

Season 4 (2004-2006)

Notes

References

Mona the Vampire